Kashi or Kaashi may refer to:

Places
 Varanasi (historically known as "Kashi"), a holy city in India
Kingdom of Kashi, an ancient kingdom in the same place, one of the sixteen Mahajanapadas
Kashi Vishwanath Temple, Varanasi
 Kashgar, a city in Xinjiang, China
Kashgar Prefecture, the prefecture encompassing the city
 Kashi, Hamadan, a village in Hamadan Province, Iran
 Kashi, Hormozgan, a village in Hormozgan Province, Iran
 Kashan, a city in the province of Isfahan, Iran

Film and television 
 Kashi – Ab Na Rahe Tera Kagaz Kora, a television series
 Kaashi, a character from the 2018 film Kaashi in Search of Ganga

Other uses
 Kashi, a short form of Kashani, a surname
 Kashi (company), U.S. manufacturer of foods, owned by Kellogg Company
 , several ships

See also 
 
 Kasi (disambiguation)
 Kasha, roasted whole-grain buckwheat or buckwheat groats